Straight-pull rifles differ from conventional bolt-action mechanisms in that the manipulation required from the user in order to chamber and extract a cartridge predominantly consists of a linear motion only, as opposed to a traditional turn-bolt action where the user has to manually rotate the bolt for chambering and primary extraction. A straight-pull mechanism is also distinct from lever action and pump action mechanisms. Most straight-pull rifles have a striker firing mechanism (without a hammer), and models using a hammer usually have a comparably longer lock time than hammer-less mechanisms.

The Anschütz Fortner action used in biathlon is a good example of an ergonomical straight-pull rifle with good economy of motion and high operating speed. The action lever is located close to the trigger, and is accessed by slightly moving the index finger off the trigger. Pulling the lever rearwards ejects the spent casing. The bolt is then pushed forward using the thumb, upon which the firing hand lands naturally in the pistol grip so that the shooter is ready to fire immediately after completing the cycling.

Smallbore

Fullbore

See also
 Biathlon rifle

Other firearm lists 
 List of weapons
 List of firearms
 List of rifles
 List of machine guns
 List of bolt-action rifles
 List of submachine guns
 List of assault rifles
 List of battle rifles
 List of semi-automatic rifles
 List of carbines
 List of pump-action rifles
 List of multiple-barrel firearms
 List of pistols
 List of semi-automatic pistols
 List of revolvers
 List of sniper rifles
 List of shotguns

References

External links 
 https://gundigest.com/rifles/hunting-rifles/the-all-un-american-straight-pull-bolt-action-rifle
 The history of Russian biathlon rifles

Straight pull rifles